Tara Leann Stiles is an American model turned yoga instructor and founder of Strala Yoga in New York City (NYC). Stiles grew Strala from one studio based in the SoHo neighbourhood of NYC to a studio and training business with currently over 1,000 instructors (called Guides) leading classes in 15 countries to thousands of people weekly. Harvard did a case study on Stiles' business titled The Branding of Yoga, which uses Stiles as a case study in branding.

In 2007, Tara starred in Yoga For, produced by Ford Models. Vanity Fair reported on a yoga video that Stiles specifically designed for Sarah Palin; the "Vanity Fair" reporter commented, "Tara Stiles has got to be the coolest yoga instructor ever."

Early life
Stiles grew up outside of the Chicago Metropolitan area, in Morris, Illinois. Her parents designed their passive solar home, helped by the fact her father worked at a nuclear plant. She has one sibling, an older brother, Chad, who is an electrician.

Career
Stiles studied dance in Chicago, where one of her ballet instructors introduced her to yoga. A local photographer brought her to Marie Anderson Boyd, founder of Aria Models in Chicago, later acquired by Ford Models. Stiles has been featured in pictorials for W, Shape Magazine, Self, Marie Claire, Fitness, and has appeared on the covers of Shape, Time Out, and Fit Yoga. Stiles appeared in ads for Nike, Adidas, Reebok, Target Corporation, Gap, and American Apparel. Stiles has been a spokesperson for Nissan Motors.

Strala Yoga
In 2008, Stiles met her husband Michael Taylor at the Ananda Ashram in Monroe, New York.

The couple founded the NYC yoga studio Strala later that year. They made up the name, which is similar to the Swedish word "stråla" which means to "radiate light". Deepak Chopra and Jane Fonda are among her students; the former considers her his personal instructor. "I have been doing yoga for 30 years," he says. "I have had teachers of all kinds. Taking lessons from her has been more useful to me than taking yoga from anyone else."

Stiles does not follow any school of yoga or instructor and focuses purely on its physical aspects and health benefits, with no philosophical or spiritual dimension. She eschews the Sanskrit names for yoga positions and does not ask students to chant. She hires instructors without regard to the certification process normally required elsewhere, preferring to assess them by watching them teach, although Strala does offer a teacher-training program. Strala's per-class fee, $10, is lower than other Manhattan yoga studios.

Her goal is to make yoga more accessible. "People need yoga, not another religious leader. Quite often in New York, they want to be religious leaders, and it's not useful," she explains. "I was never invited to the party anyway—so I started my own party." Too many people outside yoga, she believes, see it as "something Jennifer Aniston does." Fonda has praised "her ability to make yoga accessible to people who might be scared of it or think it might be too esoteric." Stiles says she receives letters regularly from people, such as military men, who do her videos but are afraid to go to a yoga studio. "This studio is the first place I have felt comfortable," one Strala student told The New York Times. "It doesn't feel like it's all 26-year-old former dancers."

Stiles' approach to yoga has met with some controversy in the yoga community. Jennilyn Carson of the popular YogaDork blog reports that some practitioners consider it "disrespect to what the practice is" for Stiles to promote it as a weight-loss method. "I don't care what Tara Stiles says yoga is," another yogini says. "It's not about making your body beautiful." Yoga traditionalists have also complained about her willingness to draw on her modeling background and exploit sex appeal in yoga-wear advertisements and her videos, some of which she has appeared in wearing short shorts and a tank top. "Who made these rules?", Stiles has responded. "I feel like I'm standing up for yoga." To critics of her videos and photo shoots, she says, "We should not be hiding behind our bodies. [They] should be empowering." To critics of her method of yoga instruction she said, "When they come to class, they see that we're guiding every single moment of movement. It's not chaos."

Collaborations
Stiles partnered with Reebok to design and launch Reebok Yoga in 2012. The first collection launched with Spring / Summer 2013. The range is available in select Nordstroms, Harrod's, Royal Sports, Rebel Sports, boutiques and studios, as well as Reebok retail stores, Reebok FitHubs, and on Reebok's e-commerce site. Stiles is closely involved with the design team and travels the world to support the range in each market. Reebok sends its "brand ambassadors" through Stiles' Intensive Programs, to help with brand awareness and support.

Stiles is an avid knitter and collaborated with Wool and the Gang on a yoga-street wear line, featuring ready-to-wear, as well as knit kits, designed by Wool and the Gang and Tara Stiles, featuring the "Tara Stiles" label on the garments.

Stiles has collaborated on DVD projects with Jane Fonda, Deepak Chopra, Brooklyn Decker, Tia Mowry and created the best-selling DVD series This is Yoga, translated into three languages and available in every country.

Books

In 2013, Tara moved publishing houses to Hay House. She appears on the Hay House speakers circuit, and is one of their most popular authors, part of the next generation of leaders in the field of wellbeing. Make Your Own Rules Diet was released November 10, 2014 by Hay House. Make Your Own Rules Cookbook was released Nov 2015. All of Stiles' books are translated into several languages.

Television
Stiles was a contestant and winner of MTV's Fear episode 9, "Fort Gains." She also has appeared in Matthew Barney's The Cremaster Cycle: Cremester 3. She co-hosted three segments on fitness and fashion with Pedro Andrade, Siafa Lewis, and Margherita Missoni.

References

External links
 
 
 
 
 Tara Stiles Video Interview on TDL Profiles

1981 births
21st-century American businesspeople
American female models
American non-fiction writers
Living people
People from Morris, Illinois
American yoga teachers
Women yogis
21st-century American women